Stephens Island is a member of the Arctic Archipelago in the territory of Nunavut. Located in Milne Inlet just north of Koluktoo Bay, it is an irregularly shaped island off the Baffin Island coast.

External links 
 Stephens Island in the Atlas of Canada - Toporama; Natural Resources Canada

Islands of Baffin Island
Uninhabited islands of Qikiqtaaluk Region